The Union Theatre was a theatre in Peterborough, Ontario, Canada that existed from 1989 to 1996.

The theatre was established by local theatre artists in 1989. It served as an arts collective serving local and regional theatre, visual arts and musical artists with a focus on helping emerging artists find a place to showcase their talents. The space was primarily a performance space "black box" style theatre but often played host to a variety of performance and installation works.

As a "collective" the space was run by a revolving membership of artists, some of whom have gone on to open larger, more mainstream theatres in Canada, including Robert Winslow, one of the space's founding members who in 1991 started Fourth Line Theatre in Millbrook, Ontario.

History

The Union Theatre was located at 188½ Hunter Street West in a space rumoured to have been an old undertakers facility (this was the inspiration for the weekly semi-improvised show The Coffin Factory). A group of local theatre artists, including Robert Winslow, Trent University professor Ian McLachlan and members of Theatre Trent, along with other performance artists banded together to continue the work they had done in various Peterborough performance endeavors. One stated aim was finding a permanent home for Winslow's company East City Productions which originally made its home in Peterborough's Market Hall Theatre, the home of the Artspace art gallery. In a Peterborough Examiner article in July 2005, Winslow reminisced about the Union Theatre calling it "poverty theatre". Winslow went on to state, "Nobody was making anything, everyone was poor," he says. "We made all the decisions collectively, which was a real challenge, and basically ran the space."  In the same article McLachlan said about the Union Theatre: "It may have been a constant struggle to survive, but the productions that came out of the Union were some of the most innovative this community has seen. "There were very exciting productions done on a minuscule budget." as well as a late night coffee house.
 The Union Theatre was noted in Anne Russell's edition of Aphra Behn's The Rover as one of a selection of small theatres in the 20th century to produce the rarely produced Restoration comedy script.

Collective space
Collective members met bi-weekly to decide issues of space use, booking of shows, space upkeep and funding. Since the space was a not-for-profit organization it relied completely on the 50% of its door proceeds for its success. The Union Theatre received ongoing funding from a number of individuals and Theatre Trent. Different shows received funding from the City of Peterborough's Arts and Culture committee as well as from The Canada Council and The Ontario Arts Council. Funding also came from private donors, fund raising shows and dances, as well as lucrative all-ages dance shows that were based on the Rave movement with all-night dancing and music. Despite an always-full schedule of events, the space still struggled for survival and was often on the verge of closure - see "Union Theatre Losing its Home" below in Selected Posters and Articles.

Following the tenets of Consensus decision-making, collective meetings often took well over three hours to cover items ranging from general upkeep of the space to which funding bodies to canvass for funding. Each meeting had a revolving "facilitator" who was expected to organize the flow of ideas, encourage respectful interaction, manage the meeting's timeline, summarize ideas, move towards consensus and follow the agenda.

To be a member of the Union Theatre, artists need only to have attended meetings. One could attend meetings regularly or sporadically, but were required to attend each meeting during pre-production and the show's run if one was the producer or director of a specific piece. While there were certain members who "held the keys" to the space at all times and who had signing rights on the group's bank account, each member of the collective was provided access to the space at any time, provided bookings were pre-set at a collective meeting.

Season brochures 

Starting in the summer of 1990, The Union Theatre published 3 season brochures per year: Summer, Fall and Winter/Spring.  These brochures were produced by collective member Fredrik Graver until his departure from Peterborough in the spring of 1993.

 Brochure 1: Summer 1990

With the second season brochure, the collective began naming the seasons.  The Fall 1990 season was named "The Only Season", both as a reference to the lack of other theatre in Peterborough and a nod to the nearby Only Café where performers and audiences often ended their nights.

 Brochure 2: The Only Season (fall 1990)
 Brochure 3: The Winter of Our Discontent (winter/spring 1991)
 Brochure 4: Hard Times (summer 1991)
 Brochure 5: fall 1991 (fall 1991)
 Brochure 6: Thumbs Up!(winter/spring 1992)
 Brochure 7: The Canadian Season(summer 1992)
 Brochure 8: The Naked Season (fall 1992)
 Brochure 9: Survival? Season (winter/spring 1993)  This brochure marked a departure from the tri-fold single-sheet style to a multi-page booklet.

Selected posters and articles 

 Poster for "The Unconnected Trilogy", a series of one-act plays performed at the Union Theatre in March 1992
 Programme for "The Unconnected Trilogy", performed at The Union Theatre in March 1992
 Poster for theatrical performance of "A Night of One Act Plays" at the Union Theatre, March 13 to 17, 1991 (low-resolution video capture).

See also
 The Rover (play)

References

 Peterborough Examiner January 18, 2001.
 Peterborough Examiner January 21, 2006.
 Peterborough Examiner July 2, 2005, p. B8.

External links
Fourth Line Theatre, company opened by Robert Winslow, one of The Union Theatre's founding members

Theatres in Ontario
Buildings and structures in Peterborough, Ontario
Former theatres in Canada
Theatres completed in 1989
1989 establishments in Ontario
1996 disestablishments in Ontario